The Chinese Journal of Cancer is a monthly peer-reviewed open access medical journal covering oncology. The  editor-in-chief is Rui-Hua Xu of the Sun Yat-sen University Cancer Center. It is published by BioMed Central and sponsored by the Sun Yat-sen University Cancer Center. The journal was established in 1982.

Abstracting and indexing
The journal is abstracted and indexed in:
Science Citation Index Expanded
MEDLINE/PubMed
Scopus
According to the Journal Citation Reports, the journal has a 2017 impact factor of 4.11.

References

External links

Journal page at Sun Yat-sen University

Oncology journals
BioMed Central academic journals